Sueños (English: Dreams) is the second mixtape by Panamanian singer Sech, released on April 19, 2019, through Rich Music. The album was produced by Dimelo Flow, Rike Music, The Rudeboyz, Jhon El Diver, Mista Bombo, Simon, Slow Mike and BF Jeezy, and features collaborations with Darell, Manuel Turizo, Farruko, Zion & Lennox, Justin Quiles, Nicky Jam, Lenny Tavárez, De La Ghetto and Dimelo Flow.

At the 20th Annual Latin Grammy Awards, the album was nominated for Best Urban Music Album while the song "Otro Trago" received nominations for Best Urban Fusion/Performance and Best Urban Song. The album also received nominations for Top Latin Album of the Year and Latin Rhythm Album of the Year at the 2020 Billboard Latin Music Awards and Top Latin Album at the 2020 Billboard Music Awards.

The album peaked at number 81 and 3 at the Billboard 200 and Top Latin Albums charts, respectively, it also peaked at number 41 on the Independent Albums chart.

Background
From 2014 and 2017 Sech released several songs independently including "Miss Lonely" in 2017 (later included in the album), produced by Dimelo Flow, who would eventually produce the album, the song was successful in Panama, the country of origin of Sech, and led him to be signed by independent label Rich Music in 2018. In 2019 he released his debut studio album Sueños on April 19, 2019, being followed by "Otro Trago", a "piano-reggaeton ballad about drinking and dancing the heartbreak away", the song was highly commercially successful and made Sech a "breakout star" within the reggaeton music scene, Sech has said about the song that "it's the song that truly changed my life".

Singles
On February 28, 2019, "Solita" was released as the album's first single, the song features Puerto Rican singers Farruko and Zion & Lennox. The second single was "Otro Trago" featuring rapper Darell on April 26, 2019. A remix of the song was released on July 26, 2019 with Nicky Jam, Ozuna and Anuel AA. The song and its remix were very commercially successful, being Sech's most successful song, topping the charts in several country including Argentina, Spain and Panama, and reaching number 34 on the Billboard Hot 100 chart, as well as also peaking at number one on the Hot Latin Songs, Latin Airplay and Latin Rhythm Airplay charts, all three by Billboard.

Critical reception
American magazine Rolling Stone included the album in their list of Best Latin Albums of 2019, placing it at number 3, calling Sech "the most exceptional new Spanish-language artist of 2019", commenting on his success writing that "with so much in place to obstruct difference, it takes a lot for an Afro-Panamanian R&B singer to ascend to Billboard chart heights domestically and streaming services globally", they also highlighted the tracks "Boomerang" and "Falsas Promesas" as songs that made the album a must-listen.

Accolades

Track listing

Charts

Certifications

References

2019 debut albums